Vladimir Mitrofanovich Purishkevich (Kishinev – 1 February 1920, Novorossiysk, Russia) was a far-right politician in Imperial Russia, noted for his monarchist, ultra-nationalist, antisemitic and anticommunist views. Because of his restless behaviour, he was regarded as a loose cannon. At the end of 1916, he participated in the killing of Grigori Rasputin.

Early career 
Born as the son of a poor nobleman in Bessarabia, now Moldova, Purishkevich graduated from Novorossiysk University with a degree in classical philology. Around 1900, he moved to Saint Petersburg. He became a member of the Russian Assembly group and was appointed under Vyacheslav von Plehve.

During the Russian Revolution of 1905, he helped organise the Black Hundreds as a militia to aid the police in the fight against left-wing extremists and to restore order. After the October Manifesto, he was one of the founders of the Union of the Russian People and its deputy chairman. Following a disagreement with Alexander Dubrovin on the influence of the State Duma, he founded his own organisation, the Union of the Archangel Michael, in 1908.

The popular Purishkevich, described by Vladimir Kokovtsov as a charming, unstable man who could not stay a single minute in one place, was elected as a deputy of the second, third and fourth Imperial Dumas for the Bessarabian and Kursk province. He gained fame for his flamboyant speeches and scandalous behaviour such as speaking on the 1st of May with a red carnation in his fly. He was a hardline supporter of sacerdotal autocracy, and of Russification to create unity. Purishkevich's hostility to the Jews was caused by his perception of them to be the "vanguard of the revolutionary movement". He wanted them to be deported to Kolyma. He believed that the "Kadets, socialists, the intelligentsia, the press and councils of university professors" were all under the control of Jews.

During the war, Purishkevich became critical of the performance of the government and the role of Alexandra and Rasputin but not of the Tsar.

Criticism of Rasputin
On 3 November 1916, Purishkevich went to Mogilev and talked with Tsar Nicolas II on Rasputin. On 19 November, Purishkevich gave a speech in the Duma and coined the phrase "ministerial leapfrog" to describe the seemingly continuous government reshuffles.

He compared Rasputin with the False Dmitri. The monarchy was becoming discredited:

Purishkevich stated that Rasputin's influence over the Tsarina had made him a threat to the empire: "an obscure moujik shall govern Russia no longer!" "While Rasputin is alive, we cannot win".

Killing of Rasputin
Prince Felix Yusupov was impressed by the speech. He visited Purishkevich, who quickly agreed to participate in the killing of Rasputin. Also, Grand Duke Dmitri Pavlovich joined the conspiracy. Purishkevich talked to Samuel Hoare, the head of the British Secret Intelligence Service in Petrograd.

A wealthy person, Purishkevich organised a medical aid that went up and down to the Eastern Front to deliver wounded soldiers to the hospitals in Tsarskoye Selo.

On the evening of 16 December 1916, the conspirators gathered in the Moika Palace and eventually killed Rasputin.

A curious policeman on duty on the other side of the Moika had heard the shots, rang at the door, and was sent away. Half an hour later, another policeman arrived, and Purishkevich invited him into the palace. Purishkevich told him that he had shot Rasputin and asked him to keep it quiet for the sake of the Tsar.

They had planned to burn Rasputin's possessions. Sukhotin put on Rasputin's fur coat, rubber boots, and gloves. He left with Dmitri and Dr. Lazovert in Purishkevich's car, which suggests that Rasputin had left the palace alive. Because Purishkevich's wife refused to burn the fur coat and the boots in her small fireplace in the ambulance train, the conspirators went back to the palace with the larger items.

Yusupov and Dmitri were placed under house arrest in the Sergei Palace. The Tsarina had refused to meet them but said that they could explain to her what had happened in a letter. Purishkevich assisted them and left the city to the Romanian front at ten in the evening. Because of his popularity, Purishkevich was neither punished nor banned.

Revolutionary Russia

During the February Revolution in 1917, many right-wingers were arrested but Purishkevich was tolerated by the government and so was "virtually the only former national Black Hundred leader to maintain an active political life in Russia after the Tsar's downfall". However, the revolution meant that Purishkevich initially had to moderate his politics. He called for the abolition of the Soviets, who were, in turn, calling for the abolition of the Duma.

In August 1917, he wanted a military dictatorship; he was arrested over the Kornilov Affair but was released. Following the failure of the putsch, he collaborated with Fyodor Viktorovich Vinberg in forming an underground monarchist organisation. During the October Revolution, he organized the "Committee for the Motherland's Salvation". He was joined by a number of officers, military cadets, and others.

At the time, Purishkevich was living in the Hotel Russia at Moika 60. He had a false passport under the surname "Yevreinov". On 18 November 1917, Purishkevich was arrested by the Red Guards for his participation in a counterrevolutionary conspiracy after the discovery of a letter sent by him to General Aleksei Maksimovich Kaledin in which he urged the Cossack leader to come and restore order in Petrograd. He became the first person to be tried in the Smolny Institute by the first Revolutionary Tribunal. He was condemned to eleven months of 'public work' and four years of imprisonment with obligatory community service and won the admiration of his fellow prisoners in the Fortress of St Peter and St Paul by his courageous bearing. He was given an amnesty on May 1 after the mediation of Felix Dzerzhinsky and Nikolay Krestinsky, as he refrained from any political activity. In jail, he had written a poem describing the Treaty of Brest-Litovsk as 'The Trotsky Peace'.

White Russia

After his release, he moved to White Army controlled Southern Russia. There, during the Russian Civil War he published the monarchist journal Blagovest and returned openly to his traditional political stance of support for the monarchy, a unified Russia, and opposition to the Jews. In some of the towns occupied by the Volunteer Army, he gave lectures in which he denounced the British policy towards Russia. In 1918, he formed a new political party, the People's State Party, and called for an "open fight against Jewry"; the party collapsed after his death.

Vladimir Purishkevich died from typhus that raged Novorossiysk in 1920, just before the final evacuation of Denikin's Army.

Reputation
In 1925, Soviet writer Liubosh would describe Purishkevich as the 'first' fascist. He was subsequently referred to as a "leader of early Russian fascism" by Semyon Reznik, who also claimed that Purishkevich participated in numerous pogroms and was a significant proponent of the blood libel against Jews.

References

Sources
 Vladimir Pourichkevitch (1924) Comment j'ai tué Raspoutine. Pages de Journal. J. Povolozky & Cie. Paris. Translated and published as The murder of Rasputin (1985) Ardis.
 

1870 births
1920 deaths
Politicians from Chișinău
People from Kishinyovsky Uyezd
Members of the Union of the Russian People
Members of the Russian Assembly
Members of the 2nd State Duma of the Russian Empire
Members of the 3rd State Duma of the Russian Empire
Members of the 4th State Duma of the Russian Empire
Blood libel
Russian conspiracy theorists
Russian anti-communists
Antisemitism in Russia
Russian murderers
Kishinev pogrom
Russian people of Polish descent
Russian people of Moldovan descent